Marry Me is a 2022 American romantic comedy-drama film directed by Kat Coiro, with a screenplay by John Rogers, Tami Sagher, and Harper Dill. Based on the 2012 graphic novel of the same title by Bobby Crosby, it stars Jennifer Lopez as Kat Valdez, a pop star, who decides to marry Charlie Gilbert (Owen Wilson), a math teacher holding a "Marry Me" sign, after learning that her on-stage bridegroom Bastian (Maluma) has been having an affair. John Bradley, Sarah Silverman, Ricky Guillart, and Chloe Coleman also star in supporting roles.

The film was announced in April 2019, with Lopez and Wilson set to star and Coiro joining the project as director. Universal Pictures acquired the film distribution rights in July 2019. Principal photography took place in Manhattan in October and November 2019. A soundtrack album of the same name by Lopez and Maluma was also produced. The lead single, titled "Pa' Ti", was released on September 24, 2020, and debuted at number nine on Billboard'''s Hot Latin Songs, marking Lopez's highest chart debut in the United States since 2017.Marry Me premiered in Los Angeles on February 9, 2022, and was released in the United States theatrically and simultaneously available on Peacock Premium on February 11. It was delayed twice from an original February 2021 release date due to the COVID-19 pandemic. The film received mixed reviews from critics, grossing $50.5 million at the box office. Marry Me also became the most-streamed day-and-date title on Peacock.

Plot
Pop superstar Kat Valdez is a long known starlet of the Latin community who has had two failed high-profile marriages. After "Marry Me", a song by Kat and her fiancé, Bastian, becomes a chart-topper across the world, they plan to hold their wedding ceremony in front of a streaming audience at one of Kat's concerts. Charlie Gilbert, a divorced math teacher, is guilt-tripped into attending the concert with his friend Parker and his daughter, Lou, who has lately been less enthused with her father.

Right before Kat is prepared to go to the altar, Page Six showbiz gossip website uncover Bastian's infidelity with her assistant Tyra and broadcast it to her fans & backstage crew at the concert. Kat's manager shows her his phone, revealing the news to her. In distress, Kat sees Charlie in the crowd holding Parker's sign reading "Marry Me". To Charlie and everyone else's surprise, she impulsively decides to marry him. Unsure, Charlie goes onstage and marries Kat in front of the world. After the ceremony, Kat refuses to speak with Bastian or Tyra as she and Charlie leave. The two are awkward and polite to each other before Kat goes home with a broken heart. The media is in a frenzy, speculating about Kat's mental state.

The following day, needing to respond to the media attention, Kat decides to stay married to Charlie for a few months to put a positive spin on the situation. He reluctantly agrees, not wanting to cause a stir in either of their personal lives. Charlie poses for media appearances, though he is uncomfortable with the scrutiny. They eventually begin to grow close after spending time together away from the media and her management. Kat also meets Charlie's students and Lou. He eventually asks Kat to his school dance as a date, and she accepts. That night they kiss and sleep together. They spend the next few weeks together in a real romantic relationship. Charlie prepares his math team for a mathalon with Kat's encouragement to the students. She teaches Lou, who has stage fright, to dance to take her mind off her anxiety.

Bastian shows up to announce that "Marry Me" has been nominated for a Grammy, Kat's first nomination. Charlie is wary of the fact that Kat and Bastian will have to perform together again, but Kat insists it is over between them. However, Charlie becomes unsure that he can compare to Bastian and fit into Kat's world. He breaks up with her, reasoning that their marriage was not real.

Kat writes a love song about Charlie, "On My Way", that becomes more successful than "Marry Me". Kat realizes it is the day before the mathalon, where she promised to support Lou and Charlie, as she is doing press on The Tonight Show with Bastian. She corrects rumors, stating that she and Bastian are not back together and she did not write "On My Way" for Bastian, but for Charlie. Kat runs out on their performance. She goes to the mathalon to reunite with Charlie, who is helping Lou overcome her stage fright with the dance Kat taught her. Kat holds up a sign asking Charlie to marry her again, to which Charlie agrees. Kat, Charlie, and Lou become a happy family with their dog. In the credits, a series of couples and their stories of how they met are shown.

Cast

Production
In April 2019, it was announced that Jennifer Lopez and Owen Wilson would star in the romantic comedy film Marry Me. Kat Coiro would direct, from a screenplay by John Rogers, Tami Sagher, and Harper Dill, based upon the graphic novel of the same name by Bobby Crosby, and STX Entertainment would distribute. In July 2019, it was announced Universal Pictures would distribute the film instead of STX. That same month, Sarah Silverman, John Bradley, and Maluma joined the cast of the film. Michelle Buteau, Jameela Jamil, and Chloe Coleman were cast in October. Principal photography began in and around New York City in October 2019, and concluded on November 22.

 Music 

ReleaseMarry Me had its world premiere in Los Angeles on February 9, 2022. It was released in theaters on February 11, 2022, by Universal Pictures. It was previously set for February 12, 2021, but was delayed to May 14, 2021 due to the COVID-19 pandemic, until it was moved to February 11, 2022 because of another shift in the release schedule. It was available for streaming on Peacock the same day. Universal spent $15 million in television commercials promoting the film by the time it premiered in theaters. According to social media analytic RelishMix, the film had a large social media reach of 546.5 million interactions, a number larger than other musicals like 2021's West Side Story at 211.8 million interactions, 2017's The Greatest Showman at 313.2 million, and 2018's Bohemian Rhapsody at 242.1 million.

Home mediaMarry Me was released on digital platforms and on Amazon Prime Video on March 13, 2022 and on physical media on Blu-ray, DVD, and Ultra HD Blu-ray on March 29, 2022 by Universal Pictures Home Entertainment.

Reception
 Box office Marry Me grossed $22.5million in the United States and Canada, and $28million in other territories, for a worldwide total of $50.5million.

In the United States and Canada, Marry Me was released alongside Death on the Nile and Blacklight, and was projected to gross $6–11 million from 3,642 theaters in its opening weekend. The film went on to debut to $7.95 million, finishing third behind Death on the Nile and holdover Jackass Forever. Women made up 67% of the audience during its opening, with those in the age range of 18–34 comprising 47% of ticket sales and those above 35 comprising 46%. The ethnic breakdown of the audience showed that 53% were Caucasian, 30% Hispanic and Latino Americans, 8% African American, and 5% Asian or other. On Valentine's Day, the movie scored the first place at the box office with $3 million, making it the first romantic comedy film to lead the Valentine's Day box office since About Last Night in 2014.<ref>{{cite web|url=https://deadline.com/2022/02/box-office-marry-me-death-on-the-nile-valentines-day-jennifer-lopez-1234933746/|title=Jennifer Lopez-Owen Wilson Romantic Comedy Marry Me Leads Valentine's Day Box Office With $3M; Death On The Nile 4-Day At $15.5M|date=February 15, 2022|first=Anthony|last=D'Alessandro|website=Deadline Hollywood|access-date=February 23, 2022}}</ref> The film earned $3.7 million in its second weekend, and $1.9 million in its third. Marry Me dropped out of the box office top ten in its fourth weekend, finishing eleventh with $556,725.

Outside the U.S. and Canada, the film grossed $16.5 million in its opening weekend from 65 international markets. In Mexico, the film topped the box office with $630,000. The film earned $5.2 million in its second weekend, $2.65 million in its third, and $1.07 million in its fourth from 67 markets.

Audience viewership 
Marry Me became the most-streamed day-and-date film on Peacock, according to Comcast CEO and chairman Brian L. Roberts. In April 2022, Deadline Hollywood reported that over six million Peacock accounts had streamed the film. In June 2022, it also became a hit on Amazon Prime, staying at number one for about 2 weeks.

Critical response
  Audiences polled by CinemaScore gave the film an average grade of "B+" on an A+ to F scale, while those at PostTrak gave it a 80% positive score, with 66% saying they would definitely recommend it.

Angie Han of The Hollywood Reporter wrote: "Those hoping the film might push the genre to its most extravagant limits may be surprised at how (relatively) low-key their love story ends up being. But sometimes that's the most pleasurable kind of fairy tale — one so close to convincing, you can forget for a spell that it's all just a dream." Owen Gleiberman of Variety wrote that "[the] bar for rom-coms is not high, and this one, ludicrous as it often is, inches over the bar. But I would no more call it a good movie than I'd pretend fast food is high in nutrients."

Accolades

References

External links
 
 

2022 films
2022 romantic comedy films
American romantic comedy films
Films about educators
Films about interracial romance
Films about marriage
Films about singers
Films about social media
Films based on American comics
Films based on webcomics
Films directed by Kat Coiro
Films postponed due to the COVID-19 pandemic
Films scored by John Debney
Films set in New York City
Films shot in New York City
Films with screenplays by John Rogers
Live-action films based on comics
Perfect World Pictures films
Nuyorican Productions films
Universal Pictures films
2020s English-language films
2020s American films